The UCI Track Cycling World Championships – Men's madison is the world championship madison event held annually at the UCI Track Cycling World Championships. It was first held at the 1995 championships in Bogotá, Colombia. , Joan Llaneras of Spain (1997, 1999 and 2006), Mark Cavendish of Great Britain (2005, 2008 and 2016) and Michael Mørkøv of Denmark (2009, 2020 and 2021) have won the most titles.

Medalists

Medal table

External links
Track Cycling World Championships 2016–1893 bikecult.com
World Championship, Track, Madison, Elite cyclingarchives.com

 
Men's madison
Lists of UCI Track Cycling World Championships medalists